Ravenea hypoleuca is a species of palm tree. It is endemic to Madagascar, where it grows in two locations within southeast Madagascar; One is near a town called Vondrozo and the other near Tsitongambarika. There are only about 40 mature trees known in their natural range.

References

hypoleuca
Endemic flora of Madagascar
Critically endangered flora of Africa